St. Andrew's Episcopal Church is a historic Episcopal church building in Scotland, South Dakota, in the United States. The brick Gothic Revival style building was built in 1886, and was added to the National Register of Historic Places on June 17, 1982.

St. Andrew's is no longer an active parish in the Episcopal Diocese of South Dakota. In 2001, Preserve South Dakota, headquartered only a few blocks away at  351 4th Street in Scotland, placed it on its list of threatened historic properties in South Dakota. Its current status according to Preserve South Dakota is threatened with the notation: "building is privately owned, vacant with broken windows and roof leaks."

References

Churches on the National Register of Historic Places in South Dakota
Episcopal churches in South Dakota
Churches in Bon Homme County, South Dakota
Churches completed in 1886
Gothic Revival church buildings in South Dakota
National Register of Historic Places in Bon Homme County, South Dakota
Scotland, South Dakota
Unused buildings in South Dakota